Pierogi leniwe, leniwe (literally "lazy dumplings") - dumplings made of quark, eggs and flour, boiled in lightly salted water. Most frequently served with double/ sour cream, sugar or bespeckled with butter, fried bread crumbs, as well as with sugar and cinnamon.

See also
Kluski
Polish cuisine

References

Polish cuisine